William Halpenny (May 23, 1882 – February 10, 1960) was a Canadian track and field athlete who competed in the 1912 Summer Olympics. He was born in Prince Edward Island. In 1912 he won a bronze medal in the pole vault event.

References

External links
William Halpenny's profile at Sports Reference.com
 Bill Halpenny, First Island Olympian by Charles Ballem

1882 births
1960 deaths
Canadian male pole vaulters
Olympic track and field athletes of Canada
Athletes (track and field) at the 1912 Summer Olympics
Olympic bronze medalists for Canada
Sportspeople from Prince Edward Island
Medalists at the 1912 Summer Olympics
Olympic bronze medalists in athletics (track and field)